The Federal Building, also known as the Old Post Office, is a historic institutional building located at 201 North Vienna Street in Ruston, Louisiana.

Built in 1909 to host Ruston Post Office, the structure is a small one-story rectangular limestone building with a hipped roof featuring circular dormers. The building was vacated about 1961 when a new post office was built, and was then used since 1963 as a federal office building.

The building was listed on the National Register of Historic Places on October 9, 1974.

See also
 National Register of Historic Places listings in Lincoln Parish, Louisiana
 Downtown Ruston Historic District

References

Federal buildings in the United States
Buildings and structures on the National Register of Historic Places in Louisiana
Government buildings completed in 1909
Lincoln Parish, Louisiana
National Register of Historic Places in Lincoln Parish, Louisiana
1909 establishments in Louisiana